Omero is an Italian given name whose English equivalent is Homer.

Omero may refer to:

Omero Antonutti (born 1935), Italian actor and dubber
Omero Bonoli (1909–1934), Italian gymnast and 1932 Olympic pommel horse silver medalist
Omero Carmellini (born 1921), Italian retired footballer
Omero Losi (born 1925), Italian retired footballer
Omero Tognon (1924–1990), Italian footballer

See also
Omeros, an epic poem by Nobel Prize-winning author Derek Walcott

Italian masculine given names

de:Omero